Animex Producciones is a Mexican animation studio, established in Puebla, which specializes in digital animation productions for film and television. It was founded in 2000 by Ricardo Arnaiz. The studio utilizes the Toon Boom Animation software for 2D productions. To this day it was no longer interested to produce more cartoonist content, instead of this they opted to make live action films and tv series.

Films
La Leyenda de la Nahuala (2007)
Nikté (2009)
La Revolución de Juan Escopeta (2011)
Selección Canina (2015)
El Americano: The Movie (2016) - co-production with Phil Roman Entertainment and Olmos Productions
Neri Vela: Espacio sin Limites (2022)
Maya. La Primera Gran Historia (Cancelled)

References

External links
Official Website
Animex at the Internet Movie Database
 

Mass media companies established in 2000
Film production companies of Mexico
Mexican animation studios
Mexican companies established in 2000